John Joseph Wojcik (born April 6, 1942) is an American former professional baseball player. He played parts of three seasons for the Kansas City Athletics of Major League Baseball, primarily as an outfielder.

Wojcik graduated from McKinley Vocational High School and Erie County Technical Institute where he played college baseball and college basketball.

He was signed as an amateur free agent by the Athletics in 1961. He made his major league debut on September 9, 1962. In 148 career at bats, Wojcik collected 27 hits for a .218 batting average and had only four extra-base hits, all doubles.

Wojcik's professional baseball career ended in 1965 after five seasons.

References

External links

1942 births
Living people
Albuquerque Dukes players
American people of Polish descent
Baseball players from New York (state)
Dallas Rangers players
Hawaii Islanders players
Kansas City Athletics players
Major League Baseball outfielders
People from Olean, New York
Portland Beavers players
Visalia A's players
SUNY Erie alumni
Junior college men's basketball players in the United States
Junior college baseball players in the United States